James P. Gray (born June 1949) is an American politician from the state of New Hampshire. A Republican, Gray has represented the 6th district in the New Hampshire Senate since 2016.

Prior to his election to the Senate, he served two terms in the New Hampshire House of Representatives for Strafford's 8th district. Gray also serves on the Rochester City Council for the 6th ward and previously worked as the town moderator.

In the senate, Gray has served as chair as the election law and municipal affairs committee and vice chair of the health and human services committee since December 2020. He is also chair of the special committee on redistricting from 2021 to 2022. Gray previously chaired the now-decommissioned public and municipal affairs committee from December 2016  to December 2018.

References

1949 births
21st-century American politicians
Living people
Republican Party members of the New Hampshire House of Representatives
Republican Party New Hampshire state senators
University of New Hampshire alumni